Pelso Strict Nature Reserve is a strict nature reserve located in Northern Ostrobothnia, Finland. The swampy reserve is noted for its bird fauna.

Strict nature reserves of Finland
Geography of North Ostrobothnia
Siikalatva